Pallathadka Pramoda Kumari is a Senior Scientist at the Institute of Materials Research and Engineering, Singapore.

She has a number of patents and research publications to her credit.

References 

Indian materials scientists
Year of birth missing (living people)
Living people
Engineers from Kerala
People from Kasaragod district